Ole Bloch Jensen (born 26 February 1943) is a Danish rower. He competed in the men's quadruple sculls event at the 1980 Summer Olympics.

References

1943 births
Living people
Danish male rowers
Olympic rowers of Denmark
Rowers at the 1980 Summer Olympics
Rowers from Copenhagen